Sidi Bennour Province is a province of Morocco in the Casablanca-Settat Region. The province had a population of 452,448 people in 2014.

Administrative divisions

References

 
Provinces of Casablanca-Settat